5635 Cole is a background asteroid from the inner regions of the asteroid belt, approximately  in diameter. It was discovered on 2 March 1981, by American astronomer Schelte Bus at the Siding Spring Observatory in Australia. The L/S-type asteroid has a rotation period of 5.79 hours. It was named after the fictional character .

Orbit and classification 

Cole is a non-family asteroid of the main belt's background population when applying the hierarchical clustering method to its proper orbital elements. It orbits the Sun in the inner main-belt at a distance of 1.7–3.0 AU once every 3 years and 8 months (1,345 days; semi-major axis of 2.39 AU). Its orbit has an eccentricity of 0.27 and an inclination of 7° with respect to the ecliptic. The body's observation arc begins with a precovery taken at the discovering Siding Spring Observatory on 9 February 1981, or four weeks prior to its official discovery observation.

Naming 

This minor planet was named after fictional character  in the novel Cole of Spyglass Mountain (1923) by Arthur Preston Hankins. The protagonist, reminiscent of Oliver Twist, is an amateur astronomer in a dystopian society where boys receive numbers instead of names. The official naming citation was prepared by David H. Levy and published by the Minor Planet Center on 14 December 1997.

Physical characteristics 

In the Moving Object Catalog of the Sloan Digital Sky Survey, Cole has a spectral type is closest to an L-type asteroid followed by the common, stony S-type. The Collaborative Asteroid Lightcurve Link also assume it to be an S-type asteroid.

Rotation period 

In September 2004, two rotational lightcurves of Cole were obtained from photometric observations by Donald Pray, Silvano Casulli, René Roy. Lightcurve analysis gave a well-defined rotation period of 5.792 and 5.7937 hours with a brightness amplitude of 0.33 and 0.30 magnitude, respectively.

Diameter and albedo 

According to the survey carried out by the NEOWISE mission of NASA's Wide-field Infrared Survey Explorer, Cole measures between 3.51 and 4.263 kilometers in diameter and its surface has an albedo between 0.29 and 0.294, while the Collaborative Asteroid Lightcurve Link assumes a standard albedo for a stony asteroids of 0.20, and calculates a diameter of 4.71 kilometers based on an absolute magnitude of 14.0.

References

External links 
 Lightcurve Database Query (LCDB), at www.minorplanet.info
 Dictionary of Minor Planet Names, Google books
 Asteroids and comets rotation curves, CdR – Geneva Observatory, Raoul Behrend
 Discovery Circumstances: Numbered Minor Planets (5001)-(10000) – Minor Planet Center
 
 

005635
Discoveries by Schelte J. Bus
Named minor planets
19810302